Mary Baguley (died 1675) was an English woman who was executed for witchcraft.

She was accused of having bewitched the schoolteacher Robert Hall of Wincle, and to have caused his death by use of magic.

She was executed by hanging in Wildboarclough in Cheshire 1675. Her trial belonged to the last witch trials in England to have resulted in an execution, since witch trials gradually became fewer after the restoration of 1660.

References

17th-century English people
Witch trials in England
People executed for witchcraft
1675 deaths
17th-century executions by England